Frankie Meets Jack is a 2023 American romantic comedy film directed by Andrew Lawrence, written by Jen Bashian, Samantha Cope, and Joey Lawrence which is produced by Richard Switzer. The film stars Joey Lawrence, Samantha Cope, Carl McDowell, Sharayu Mahele, and Anne Heche.

Cast 
 Joey Lawrence as Jack Shaw
 Samantha Cope as Frankie
 Carl McDowell as Boner
 Sharayu Mahale as Melody
 Anne Heche as Katrina
 Andrew Lawrence as Nathaniel
 Brytnee Ratledge as Stacy
 Pamela Mitchell as Angela
 Madeline Grey DeFreece as Tara
 Ryan Youngwood Kim as Todd
 Zachary Gaviria as Dylan
 Mary Looram as Mary
 Joe Harkins as Harry
 Reid Perkins as Wedding Officiant

Production 
Production of the film takes place in Braintree, Massachusetts from June 27 to July 13.

Release 
Frankie Meets Jack was released in Tubi on February 3, 2023. The film is dedicated in memory of Heche, who died before the film was released.

Reception
Josh Bell from Crooked Marquee said, "Stars Lawrence and Cope, who wrote the screenplay themselves along with Jen Bashian, have minimal chemistry, and only the late Anne Heche livens things up as Frankie's roommate’s eccentric mom. Somehow, even the dog acting is bad. Grade: C-".

References

External Links 
 
 

2023 films
Tubi original programming